This is a list of the tallest buildings in Ukraine. Buildings are ranked according to their architectural height. Most of Ukrainian high-rises are situated in its capital city, Kyiv. Ukrainian minimal skyscraper height since 2009 is considered to be 100 metres and higher.

The current tallest building in Ukraine is the 168-metre tall Klovski Descent 7A, an apartment building that was completed in 2012 and opened in 2015. Also, the unfinished Sky Towers business centre was planned to have 214 metres, but the construction was put on hold in 2016 with only half of the building done.

Tallest buildings 
This list ranks completed and topped-out buildings. An equal sign (=) following a rank indicates the same height between two or more buildings. The "Year" column indicates the year in which a building was or will be completed.

Tallest buildings under construction, approved and proposed

Under construction

Approved and proposed

Cities with buildings over 100 metres

References

External links
 Kyiv at Skyscraperpage.com

 
Ukraine
Tallest
Ukraine